Streptomyces lushanensis is a bacterium species from the genus of Streptomyces which has been isolated from soil from the Lushan Mountain in China. Streptomyces lushanensis has antibacterial activity.

See also 
 List of Streptomyces species

References

External links
Type strain of Streptomyces lushanensis at BacDive -  the Bacterial Diversity Metadatabase	

lushanensis
Bacteria described in 2015